Pycnarmon dichocrocidalis is a moth in the family Crambidae . It was described by Embrik Strand in 1918. It is found in Taiwan.

References

Spilomelinae
Moths described in 1918
Moths of Taiwan